Cocos Islands District High School is the school of the Cocos (Keeling) Islands, Australia. The West Island campus serves grades K-10 with separate primary and secondary wings while the Home Island campus serves grades K-6.

The school motto is "", which means "Cooperation and Success" in Cocos Malay.

Demographics
 about 80% of the pupils speak English as a second language. Most of the Home Island students are Cocos Malays; this differs in West Island since the majority of persons living there originated from the Australian continent.

 most staff reside on West Island, and those who teach on Home Island travel between the islands on a daily basis. The majority of staff live in residences owned and maintained by the Australian national government.

References

 
Cocos (Keeling) Islands
Public high schools in Western Australia